Ruiziella is a genus of parasitic flies in the family Tachinidae. There are at least two described species in Ruiziella.

Species
These two species belong to the genus Ruiziella:
 Ruiziella frontosa Cortes, 1951
 Ruiziella luctuosa Cortes, 1951

References

Further reading

 
 
 
 

Tachinidae
Articles created by Qbugbot